Walter Wrigge (born 30 March 1946) is a German former sports shooter. He competed in the skeet event at the 1972 Summer Olympics for West Germany.

References

1946 births
Living people
German male sport shooters
Olympic shooters of West Germany
Shooters at the 1972 Summer Olympics
People from Osorno, Chile